Lubań , sometimes called Lubań Śląski; is a town in the Lower Silesian Voivodeship in southwest Poland. It is the administrative seat of Lubań County and also of the smaller Gmina Lubań (although it is not part of the territory of the latter, as the town is a separate urban gmina in its own right).

Geography
Situated north of the Jizera Mountains on the western shore of the Kwisa River, Lubań is considered part of the historic Upper Lusatia region, although it was more closely associated with Lower Silesia in the early 14th century and from 1815. From 1975 to 1998 it was part of the former Jelenia Góra Voivodeship.

History

The town probably is at the site of a small settlement established by the West Slavic Bieżuńczanie tribe, one of the old Polish tribes, in the 9th and 10th century. Bieżuńczanie together with the Sorbian Milceni tribe, with whom they bordered in the west, were subjugated in 990 by the Margraviate of Meissen. From 1002 to 1031, the area was part of the Kingdom of Poland. In 1156, Holy Roman Emperor Frederick Barbarossa vested his ally, the Přemyslid duke Vladislaus II of Bohemia with the territory around Bautzen (Budissin), then called "Milsko", and after the 15th century called "Upper Lusatia".

Lauban was founded in the first half of the 13th century as a town with Magdeburg rights in the course of the German Ostsiedlung. It was first mentioned in 1268. Like several other town foundings under the rule of the Přemyslid dynasty, owing to its favourable location on the historic Via Regia trade route close to the border with the Duchy of Silesia, Lauban expanded rapidly. Since about 1253, Upper Lusatia temporarily had been under the rule of the Ascanian margraves John I and Otto III of Brandenburg. By the end of the 13th century, Lauban's first brewery was founded by the Franciscans and cloth production flourished thanks to Flemish settlers. In 1297, a clothiers' uprising took place, which was brutally suppressed. Its two leaders were beheaded at the market square.

In 1319, the town became part of the Duchy of Jawor of under the Piast Duke Henry I of Jawor along with lands up to the town of Görlitz. He built a new town hall, the ruins of which can be seen today (Kramarska Tower). In 1320, he founded a Magdalene monastery in Lauban. He appointed a separate wójt for the town, which to that point administratively was subordinate to the wójt of Görlitz. The centre of the medieval town was a square marketplace with perpendicular streets, leading to four gates: Görlitzer Tor (Zgorzelecka) to the west, Brüdertor (Bracka), built in 1318 together with stone curtains by Duke Henry of Jawor, to the south, Nikolaitor (Mikołajska) to the east and Naumburger Tor (Nowogrodziecka) to the north. The first mayor of the town was Nikolaus Hermann, and Lauban received its own seal.

In 1346, the town passed to the Bohemian Crown. Under the rule of Bohemian king Charles IV of Luxembourg, then ruler of the Holy Roman Empire as King of the Romans, Lauban on 10 August 1346 established the Lusatian League, together with the towns of Bautzen, Görlitz, Kamenz, Löbau and Zittau. Twice however, in 1427 and 1431, the Hussites completely demolished the town; it was quickly rebuilt. In its history, the town has repeatedly suffered great fires, which often ruined the whole town. Many inhabitants died as a result of plagues. In 1437, Bohemian King Sigismund exempted the town from taxes for 15 years.

In 1469, Lauban became part of Hungary. In 1490, it became again part of the Kingdom of Bohemia, now ruled by the Jagiellonian dynasty, and after 1526 by the House of Habsburg. In 1498, Bohemian King Vladislaus II established an annual eight-day fair. In the 15th and 16th century, brewing prospered, with local beer being popular throughout Lusatia and Silesia, it was even served in the famous Schweidnitzer Keller in Breslau (Wrocław).

With the 1635 Peace of Prague, the Habsburg Emperor Ferdinand II in his capacity as Bohemian king passed Lusatia with the town to the Electorate of Saxony. As a result of the Thirty Years' War, the local economy collapsed, and in 1659, 1670 and 1696 the town was hit by fires. Prosperity came with the Polish-Saxon Union, when from 1697 to 1706 and from 1709 to 1763 the Saxon electors Augustus II the Strong and Augustus III were also kings of Poland. The town prospered due to linen and cloth production as well as trade in Polish oxen. On 25 June 1697, a few days before being elected King of Poland, Augustus II visited the town. During his rule, the Dom pod Okrętem ("House under the Ship") was built. In 1734 a ceremonial illumination of the town took place in honor of King Augustus III of Poland.

Following the Napoleonic wars, in 1815 the Lusatian territory around Lauban and Görlitz fell to the Kingdom of Prussia after the Vienna Congress and was incorporated into the Province of Silesia. In 1865 and 1866, Lauban obtained railway connections with Görlitz and Hirschberg (present-day Jelenia Góra). Following the unification of Germany in 1871, the town became part of the German Empire.

During World War I, Lauban was the site of a large prisoner-of-war camp, whose first prisoners, from September 1914, were soldiers of Imperial Russia, including Poles and Georgians conscripted into the Russian army (large parts of Polish and Georgian lands were under Russian rule before regaining independence by both countries in 1918). From 1915, French soldiers as well as political prisoners and common criminals were also imprisoned there. Aleksandra Szczerbińska, the future wife of the leader of interwar Poland Józef Piłsudski, was imprisoned there in 1916. Józef Piłsudski and Aleksandra Piłsudska are today commemorated in Lubań with a memorial stone. During World War II, the Nazis created numerous forced labor camps in the town, the largest of which was Wohnheimlager GEMA, in which Polish and Russian women were imprisoned. Polish and Russian women were imprisoned also in other camps, as well as Russians, Hungarians, Frenchmen, Latvians and Ukrainians. The present-day district of Księginki was the location of the E231 labor subcamp of the Stalag VIII-B/344 prisoner-of-war camp for Allied POWs.

Lauban was the site of one of the last Nazi German victories in World War II. After it was taken in the Upper Silesian Offensive by the Red Army on 16 February 1945, the Wehrmacht successfully retook the town in a counterattack on 8 March 1945. After the war, the town became part of Poland in accordance with the Potsdam Agreement and was renamed to Lubań. In 1945–46, the remaining German inhabitants were expelled, and the town was repopulated by Poles, some of whom were expellees from former eastern Poland, which was annexed by the Soviet Union. In the 1950s Greeks, refugees of the Greek Civil War, settled in the town and its vicinity.

Between 1992 and 2004, the marketplace was renovated. Streets were paved and town houses around the Kramarska Tower were rebuilt.

Economy 
There are the following workplaces in Lubań:

 Przedsiębiorstwo Energetyki Cieplnej (PEC Lubań Sp. z o.o.)
 Agromet ZEHS Lubań
 Imakon Sp. z o.o.
 „IMKA” Dr. Schumacher Sp. z o.o.
 Chromex Sp. z o.o.
 Automatec Sp. z o.o.

There are also the following notable companies:

 Lubańskie Przedsiębiorstwo Wodociągów i Kanalizacji Sp. z o.o. Lubań
 Lubańskie Towarzystwo Budownictwa Społecznego Sp. z o.o. Lubań
 Przedsiębiorstwo Energetyki Cieplnej Sp. z o.o. Lubań
 Zakład Gospodarki i Usług Komunalnych Sp. z o.o. Lubań

In terms of entertainment and consumption, the town offers clubs, restaurants, swimming pools, a cinema and a small modern shopping centre.

Culture 

Lubań is the hub of culture in the Lubań Municipality. The town has a cultural centre (Dom Kultury). There is also a regional museum.

Lubań is a stop on the Polish sections of the Way of St. James pilgrimage route.

Education 
Lubań has five kindergartens, five primary schools, and three secondary schools.

The Adam Mickiewicz Post-Primary School Complex (Zespół Szkół Ponadpodstawowych im. Adama Mickiewicza w Lubaniu) is ranked amongst the best secondary schools in the entire Lower Silesian Voivodeship.

Health care 
Lubań has a hospital, the Lucjan Kopeć Lusatian Medical Centre (Łużyckie Centrum Medyczne im. Lucjana Kopcia).

Transport 
Lubań has a bus station and a train station.

Since 2011, a public transport system functions in the town.

The Polish national road 30, and Voivodeship roads 296, 357, 393 pass through the town.

Places of interest

Points of interest in Lubań include:
 Kramarska Tower – remains of the 13th-century Gothic town hall
 Stone curtains (1318), made from basalt from a local quarry. Behind the curtains were situated four main gates: Nowogrodziecka, Mikołajska, Bracka and Zgorzelecka
 Bracka Donjon, built in 1318 by Duke Henry I of Jawor
 Trynitarska Tower (1320 r.) on Wrocławska street, a remnant of Holy Trinity Church
 Salt House or Cereal House (Polish: Dom Solny/Dom Zbożowy) from 1539, a building made of basalt
 Town hall, built 1539–1543, in a Renaissance style, housing the Regional Museum (Muzeum Regionalne)
 Polish–Saxon post milestone from 1725 at the Market Square
 House under the Ship (Polish: Dom pod Okrętem) (1715), the house of the Kirchoff family, now a tax office
 Park on Kamienna Góra hill (14 hectares). Contains evidence of an extinct Tertiary volcano, such as basalt columns or “volcanic bombs”; also has a wood with exotic trees: Liriodendron tulipifera, Pinus pinea, Pinus nigra. Kamienna Góra also has an amphitheatre and a castle-style residence, which was built in 1824 and rebuilt in 1909, offering views of the Sudetes mountains (including Śnieżka, the highest peak).
 A memorial stone dedicated to the Marshal of Poland Józef Piłsudski and his wife Aleksandra Piłsudska
 Gothic Revival Holy Trinity church
 Building of the former Latin school, built 1588–1591, now housing municipal offices

Notable people
 Martin Behm, Lutheran pastor, writer
 Johann Knöfel, composer
 Jakob Bartsch, astronomer
 Konrad Gottlob Anton, orientalist
 Friedrich Wilhelm Alexander von Mechow, explorer of Africa
 Elisabeth von Saldern, Mother Superior
 Karl Hanke, NSDAP-Politician
 Otto Kuss, theologian
 Albert Brux, Wehrmacht officer
 Heinz Kessler, general, politician
 Horst Klaus, unionist
 Konrad Weiß, film director
 Helmut Bakaitis, actor
 Jacek Dewódzki, musician
 Agnieszka Stanuch, slalom canoer
 Angelika Jakubowska, model
 Zuzanna Efimienko, volleyball player
 Adriana Achcińska, football player

Twin towns – sister cities

Lubań is twinned with:

 Kamenz, Germany
 Kolín, Czech Republic
 Königsbrück, Germany
 Löbau, Germany
 Prienai, Lithuania

References

External links

Official town website
 Jewish Community in Lubań on Virtual Shtetl

 
Cities and towns in Lower Silesian Voivodeship
Cities in Silesia